India's Next Top Model, season 1 was the first installment of India's Next Top Model. The series premiered on MTV India on 19 July 2015 at 7:00 pm IST (UTC+5:30). Ten finalists were chosen to compete for the show.

Among with the prizes was a one-year contract to be the new face of TRESemmé, representation from Bling Talent Management, and the opportunity to appear in an editorial spread for Grazia magazine.

The winner of the competition was 18 year-old Danielle Canute from Mumbai.

Cast

Contestants

Judges & Mentors
 Lisa Haydon - presenter / head judge
 Dabboo Ratnani - judge
 Neeraj Gaba - mentor / image consultant

Episodes

Results

 The contestant was eliminated
 The contestant quit the competition
 The contestant was part of a non-elimination bottom two
 The contestant won the competition

References

Top Model
2015 Indian television seasons